The St Marylebone by-election of 22 October 1970 was held after Conservative Member of Parliament (MP) Quintin Hogg became a life peer. The seat was retained for the Conservatives by Kenneth Baker, who had lost his previous seat of Acton at the general election four months earlier; Baker would go on to represent the Mole Valley seat in Surrey and become a long-serving Cabinet minister.

Results

References

St Marylebone by-election
St Marylebone by-election
St Marylebone by-election
St Marylebone,1970
St Marylebone,1970